Nadezhda Petrenko is a Ukrainian soprano singer, working mostly in Prague.

Early life 

Born in Kyiv, Petrenko graduated from the Musical Academy of Arts in 1987 National Music Academy of Ukraine, finishing studies of solo singing and chorus conduction.

Career 

She became a soloist of the State Opera in Kyiv. She appeared as Liza in Kirill Molchanov's opera The Dawns Here Are Quiet and Marfa in The Tsars Bride by Rimsky-Korsakov. She sang in operas by Ukrainian composers and as Donna Anna in Mozart's Don Giovanni. At the same time she worked with the Men's Choir of Ukraine.

In 1987 she won the Ukrainian chamber soloists competition. She appeared on stages in Germany, Poland, Bulgaria, Norway, USA and Switzerland. She sang in several concert programmes of TV station CBN (USA) as well as on Russian, Ukrainian and Czech television.

In 1991 she was invited on the occasion of reopening of Estate Theatre to the National Theatre in Prague to sing as Donna Anna in Don Giovanni conducted by Sir Charles Mackerras. She became a permanent guest of the Prague National Theatre, where she played roles of Mimi in Puccinis La Bohéme or Tatiana in Eugene Onegin by P. I. Tchaikovsky.

In 1993 Petrenko appeared at Dresdens Semperoper stage in Tchaikovsky's Iolanta as the eponymous heroine. That same year, she won the prize of the Czech Union of Musical Theatre for her Violetta in Verdis La Traviata in J. K. Tyl Theatre in Pilsen.

In 1996 Petrenko took part in Europänishe Woche Passau Festival in Germany, where she sang Celebration Jazz Mass and Te Deum by Karel Růžička. In December she was given a Certificate of Merit at the International Music competition in Vienna, Austria. She recorded the solo soprano part in Requiem Solenne by Jan Zach and Mass in D Major by Jan Koželuch for Czech National Radio.

In 1997 she took part in the filming of Great Composers - Wagner for BBC (conductor Sir Roger Norrington). She played Donna Anna in Don Giovanni at Bayreuth Markgräflisches Opernhaus festival. She also sang at Prague Spring, Kutná Hora, Český Krumlov and Honour to Emma Destinová festivals. With the Pragues National Theatre ensemble, she participated in a months long tour of Don Giovanni in Japan.

In 1998 she played the role of Micaëla in G. Bizet's Carmen and also the role of Gilda in Verdi's Rigoletto.

In 1999 she played the title role in Jules Massenets Manon. In Trondheim (Norway) she sang the solo soprano part in Antonín Dvořák's Requiem.

In 2000 - 2002 she appeared as Luisa in Verdi's Luisa Miller at Jihočeské divadlo in České Budějovice. With the Berg Chamber Orchestra she sang 14th Symphony of Dmitri Shostakovich, translated by Czech National Radio.

In 2003 she attended the international festival Opera at Kaunas Castle in Lithuania.

She sang in solo programmes at U Kamenného Zvonu house and House of Ema Destinová (Prague). She also performs folk music, especially of Ukrainian and Russian origin, when assisting with conducting of Cossacks of Vltava group.

Petrenko married the tenor Viktor Bychek, with whom she had collaborated in Ukraine. They have a son, Alexej Byček, who graduated at Pragues Academy of Performing Arts and works as a theatre artist.

External links

Videos
 
 
 
 
 
 

Ukrainian operatic sopranos
Living people
Musicians from Kyiv
Kyiv Conservatory alumni
20th-century Ukrainian women opera singers
21st-century Ukrainian women opera singers
Year of birth missing (living people)